Nahirne can refer to:

 Nahirne, Crimea, a village in the Autonomous Republic of Crimea in Ukraine
 Nahirne, Kharkiv Oblast, a village in Kharkiv Oblast in Ukraine
 Nahirne, Odessa Oblast, a village in Odessa Oblast in Ukraine

See also
 Nagorny (disambiguation), similar place name in the Russian language